In Harmony may refer to:

Film
A 2015 French film titled En équilibre, known in English as In Harmony

Music
 In Harmony (music education project), a community development project in England
 In Harmony (compilation albums), two compilation albums of children's music, released in 1980 and 1982
 In Harmony (Bright album), 2010
 In Harmony, a 1979 album by Mary O'Hara
 In Harmony a 1999 album by Ladysmith Black Mambazo
 In Harmony, a 2021 album by Roy Hargrove and Mulgrew Miller